Earle Lavon "Von" Freeman Sr. (October 3, 1923 – August 11, 2012) was an American hard bop jazz tenor saxophonist.

Biography
Born in Chicago, Illinois, Freeman as a young child was exposed to jazz. His father, George, a city policeman, was a close friend of Louis Armstrong with Armstrong living at the Freeman house when he first arrived in Chicago.

Freeman's father taught him to play piano and bought him his first saxophone when he was seven. His musical education was furthered at DuSable High School, where his band director was Walter Dyett. Freeman began his professional career at the age of 16 in Horace Henderson's Orchestra.

Freeman enlisted into the Navy during World War II and was trained at Camp Robert Smalls in Chicago. "All the great musicians ended up at Great Lakes", he recalled. "It was an incubator for the best and the brightest lights in the jazz world at that time, and the musical jam sessions were simply phenomenal." After training, he was sent to Hawaii as part of the Hellcats stationed at Barbers Point Naval Air Station in a band that starred Harry "Pee Wee" Jackson, the trumpeter from Cleveland whose nickname was Gabriel. The Hellcats were frequent winners of the islands' competitive Battle of the Bands competitions and included musicians who had formerly played in bands fronted by Duke Ellington, Fletcher Henderson, Ella Fitzgerald, Lucky Millinder, Les Hite, Count Basie, Fats Waller, and Tiny Bradshaw.

After his return to Chicago, where he remained for the duration of his career, Freeman played with his brothers George on guitar and Eldridge "Bruz" Freeman on drums at the Pershing Hotel Ballroom. Various leading jazzmen such as Charlie Parker, Roy Eldridge and Dizzy Gillespie played there with the Freemans as the backing band. In the early 1950s, Von played in Sun Ra's band.

Von Freeman's first venture into the recording studio took place in 1954, backing a vocal group called The Maples for Al Benson's Blue Lake label. He appeared on Andrew Hill's second single on the Ping label in 1956, followed by some recording for Vee-Jay with Jimmy Witherspoon and Albert B. Smith in the late 1950s, and a recorded appearance at a Charlie Parker tribute concert in 1970.

In 1972, Freeman first recorded under his own name, the album Doin' It Right Now with the support of Roland Kirk. His next effort was a marathon session in 1975 released over two albums by Nessa. After that he lived, regularly performed, and recorded in Chicago. His recordings included three albums with his son, the tenorist Chico Freeman, and You Talkin' To Me with 22-year-old saxophonist Frank Catalano, following their successful appearance at the Chicago Jazz Festival in 1999. Four live albums for SteepleChase Records, "Inside Chicago" documented his partnership with trumpeter Brad Goode.

One of Freeman's contributions was his mentoring of countless younger musicians such as Corey Wilkes and Ben Paterson as well as his steadfast support of what he liked to call "hardcore jazz" (as he still did in a 2001 article in DownBeat.) Freeman's quartet played Monday nights throughout the 1970s and the mid-1980s at The Enterprise Lounge which closed when he toured Japan, and then Tuesdays at The New Apartment Lounge with his longtime trio of sidemen composed of drummer Michael Raynor, guitarist Mike Allemana and bassist Matt Ferguson. The quartet played a long set first, the vehicle that showcased Freeman's range from sensitively unwound ballads to intense improvisations that utilized his sometimes rough timbre and indefinite pitch to create a unique avant garde style of his own. His performances were also impressive verbal ones, as he served as an important figure that both helped African-American culture thrive on the South Side as well as invited the participation of European Americans and others into the warmth of the community he and the rest of the Enterprise and Apartment created.

Freeman was considered a founder of the "Chicago School" of jazz tenorists along with Gene Ammons, Johnny Griffin and Clifford Jordan. His music has been described as "wonderfully swinging and dramatic" featuring a "large rich sound". "Vonski", as he was known by his jazz fans, was selected to receive the nation's highest jazz honor, the NEA Jazz Masters award.  Freeman died of heart failure on August 11, 2012, in his home town, at the age of 88.

Freeman was the father of jazz saxophonist Chico Freeman.

Discography

As leader
 1972: Doin' It Right Now (Atlantic)
 1975: Have No Fear (Nessa)
 1975: Serenade and Blues (Nessa)
 1977: Young and Foolish (Daybreak/Challenge)
 1981: Freeman & Freeman  with Chico Freeman (India Navigation)
 1989: Walkin' Tuff (Southport)
 1992: Never Let Me Go (Steeplechase)
 1993: Lester Leaps In (Steeplechase)
 1994: Dedicated to You (Steeplechase)
 1996: Fire (Southport)
 1999: Von & Ed with Ed Petersen (Delmark)
 1999: Live at the Blue Note (Half Note)
 2000: You Talkin' to Me?  with Frank Catalano (Delmark)
 2001: Live at the Dakota (Premonition)
 2002: The Improvisor (Premonition)
 2004: The Great Divide (Premonition)
 2006: Good Forever (Premonition)
 2009: Vonski Speaks (Nessa)

As sideman
With Brad Goode
 2001 Inside Chicago, Volume 1 with Von Freeman (SteepleChase)
 2001 Inside Chicago, Volume 2 with Von Freeman (SteepleChase)
 2002 Inside Chicago, Volume 3 with Von Freeman (SteepleChase)
 2002 Inside Chicago, Volume 4 with Von Freeman (SteepleChase)

With April Aloisio
 1994 Brazilian Heart
 1996 Footprints
 1998 Easy to Love

With Francesco Crosara
 1999 Colors  (Southport)
 2003 Emotions  (TCB)

With Kurt Elling
 1995 Close Your Eyes
 2000 Live in Chicago

With Chico Freeman
 1988 You'll Know When You Get There
 2010 Lord Riff and Me

With George Freeman
 1969 Birth Sign (Delmark)
 1973 New Improved Funk (Groove Merchant)
 1977 All in the Game
 1995 Rebellion
 1999 George Burns
 2001 At Long Last George

With Joanie Pallatto
 1995 Passing Tones
 2000 The King and I

With others
 1978 Lockin' Horns, Willis Jackson
 1981 Hyde Park After Dark, Clifford Jordan (Bee Hive, 1981)
 1982 Fathers and Sons, Wynton Marsalis
 1991 Rhythm in Mind, Steve Coleman (Novus)
 1992 No One Ever Tells You, Eden Atwood
 1994 Silvering, Louis Smith
 1999 Some Cats Know, Connie Evingson
 1999 Spaces, Doug Hammond
 2000 Come Walk with Me, Martha Lorin
 2003 Emotions, Lilian Terry
 2006 Solitaire Miles, Solitaire Miles

References

External links

[ All Music]

1923 births
2012 deaths
Musicians from Chicago
American jazz tenor saxophonists
American male saxophonists
Hard bop saxophonists
Post-bop saxophonists
Atlantic Records artists
HighNote Records artists
Nessa Records artists
SteepleChase Records artists
Jazz musicians from Illinois
American male jazz musicians
20th-century American saxophonists